Lopou is a town in southern Ivory Coast. It is a sub-prefecture of Dabou Department in Grands-Ponts Region, Lagunes District.

Lopou was a commune until March 2012, when it became one of 1126 communes nationwide that were abolished.

In 2014, the population of the sub-prefecture of Lopou was 30,269.

Villages
The 14 villages of the sub-prefecture of Lopou and their population in 2014 are:

References

Sub-prefectures of Grands-Ponts
Former communes of Ivory Coast